"Listen" is a song by French DJ and music producer David Guetta, featuring vocals from American singer John Legend, from the album of the same name.

Charts

Certifications

Release history

References

2014 songs
2016 singles
Songs written by David Guetta
Songs written by Giorgio Tuinfort
Songs written by Frédéric Riesterer
Songs written by Jason Evigan
Songs written by John Legend
David Guetta songs
John Legend songs
Song recordings produced by David Guetta